Andrew Archer may refer to:

 Andrew Archer (1659–1741), English Member of Parliament for Warwickshire
 Andrew Archer, 2nd Baron Archer (1736–1778), British Member of Parliament for Bramber and Coventry
 Andy Archer (radio presenter) (born 1946), British radio presenter, active from the 1960s to the 2010s
 Andy Archer (GH Night Shift), a minor character from the American daytime soap opera General Hospital and General Hospital: Night Shift

See also
 William Andrew Archer (1894–1973), American botanist and taxonomist